Mai Nefhi (Tigrigna for "Water-Distend?") is both a location near Asmara, Eritrea and the dam after which it was named. The Mai Nefhi dam was completed in 1970, during the reign of Haile Selassie, and remains the main water source for Asmara.

Abardae a town with a population of 3000 residents is located nearby. Eritrea Institute of Technology, the only technical college in the country is located 500m away from Abardae-Mai Nefhi.

References

Asmara
Buildings and structures in Asmara
Dams in Eritrea